

Events

Pre-1600
 428 – Nestorius becomes the Patriarch of Constantinople.
 837 – Halley's Comet makes its closest approach to Earth at a distance equal to 0.0342 AU (5.1 million kilometres/3.2 million miles).
1407 – Deshin Shekpa, 5th Karmapa Lama visits the Ming dynasty capital at Nanjing and is awarded the title "Great Treasure Prince of Dharma".
1500 – Ludovico Sforza is captured by Swiss troops at Novara and is handed over to the French.
1545 – The settlement of Villa Imperial de Carlos V (now the city of Potosí) in Bolivia is founded after the discovery of huge silver deposits in the area.

1601–1900
1606 – The Virginia Company of London is established by royal charter by James I of England with the purpose of establishing colonial settlements in North America.
1710 – The Statute of Anne, the first law regulating copyright, comes into force in Great Britain.
1717 – Robert Walpole resigns from the British government, commencing the Whig Split which lasts until 1720.
1741 – War of the Austrian Succession: Prussia gains control of Silesia at the Battle of Mollwitz.
1809 – Napoleonic Wars: The War of the Fifth Coalition begins when forces of the Austrian Empire invade Bavaria.
1815 – The Mount Tambora volcano begins a three-month-long eruption, lasting until July 15. The eruption ultimately kills 71,000 people and affects Earth's climate for the next two years.
1816 – The Federal government of the United States approves the creation of the Second Bank of the United States.
1821 – Patriarch Gregory V of Constantinople is hanged by the Ottoman government from the main gate of the Patriarchate and his body is thrown into the Bosphorus.
  1821   – Greek War of Independence: the island of Psara joins the Greek struggle for independence.
1826 – The 10,500 inhabitants of the Greek town of Missolonghi begin leaving the town after a year's siege by Turkish forces. Very few of them survive.
1858 – After the original Big Ben, a  bell for the Palace of Westminster, had cracked during testing, it is recast into the current  bell by Whitechapel Bell Foundry.
1864 – Archduke Maximilian of Habsburg is proclaimed emperor of Mexico during the French intervention in Mexico.
1865 – American Civil War: A day after his surrender to Union forces, Confederate General Robert E. Lee addresses his troops for the last time.
1866 – The American Society for the Prevention of Cruelty to Animals (ASPCA) is founded in New York City by Henry Bergh.
1868 – At Arogee in Abyssinia, British and Indian forces defeat an army of Emperor Tewodros II. While 700 Ethiopians are killed and many more injured, only two British/Indian troops die.
1872 – The first Arbor Day is celebrated in Nebraska.
1875 – India: Arya Samaj is founded in Mumbai by Swami Dayananda Saraswati to propagate his goal of social reform. 
1887 – On Easter Sunday, Pope Leo XIII authorizes the establishment of the Catholic University of America.
1896 – 1896 Summer Olympics: The Olympic marathon is run ending with the victory of Greek athlete Spyridon Louis.
1900 – British suffer a sharp defeat by the Boers south of Brandfort. 600 British troops are killed and wounded and 800 taken prisoner.

1901–present
1912 – RMS Titanic sets sail from Southampton, England on her maiden and only voyage.
1916 – The Professional Golfers' Association of America (PGA) is created in New York City.
1919 – Mexican Revolution leader Emiliano Zapata is ambushed and shot dead by government forces in Morelos.
  1919   – The Third Regional Congress of Peasants, Workers and Insurgents is held by the Makhnovshchina at Huliaipole.
1925 – The Great Gatsby by F. Scott Fitzgerald is first published in New York City, by Charles Scribner's Sons.
1938 – The 1938 German parliamentary election and referendum seeks approval for a single list of Nazi candidates and the recent annexation of Austria.
1939 – Alcoholics Anonymous, A.A.'s "Big Book", is first published.
1941 – World War II: The Axis powers establish the Independent State of Croatia.
1944 – Rudolf Vrba and Alfréd Wetzler escape from Birkenau death camp.
1963 – One hundred twenty-nine American sailors die when the submarine  sinks at sea.
1968 – The TEV Wahine, a New Zealand ferry sinks in Wellington harbour due to a fierce storm – the strongest winds ever in Wellington. Out of the 734 people on board, fifty-three died.
1970 – Paul McCartney announces that he is leaving The Beatles for personal and professional reasons.
1971 – Ping-pong diplomacy: In an attempt to thaw relations with the United States, China hosts the U.S. table tennis team for a week-long visit.
1972 – Tombs containing bamboo slips, among them Sun Tzu's Art of War and Sun Bin's lost military treatise, are accidentally discovered by construction workers in Shandong.
  1972   – Vietnam War: For the first time since November 1967, American B-52 bombers reportedly begin bombing North Vietnam.
1973 – Invicta International Airlines Flight 435 crashes in a snowstorm on approach to Basel, Switzerland, killing 108 people.
1979 – Red River Valley tornado outbreak: A tornado lands in Wichita Falls, Texas killing 42 people.
1988 – The Ojhri Camp explosion kills or injures more than 1,000 people in Rawalpindi and Islamabad, Pakistan.
1991 – Italian ferry  collides with an oil tanker in dense fog off Livorno, Italy, killing 140.
  1991   – A rare tropical storm develops in the South Atlantic Ocean near Angola; the first to be documented by satellites.
1998 – The Good Friday Agreement is signed in Northern Ireland.
2009 – President of Fiji Ratu Josefa Iloilo announces the abrogation of the constitution and assumes all governance in the country, creating a constitutional crisis.
2010 – Polish Air Force Tu-154M crashes near Smolensk, Russia, killing 96 people, including Polish President Lech Kaczyński, his wife, and dozens of other senior officials and dignitaries.
2016 – The Paravur temple accident in which a devastating fire caused by the explosion of firecrackers stored for Vishu, kills more than one hundred people out of the thousands gathered for seventh day of Bhadrakali worship.
  2016   – An earthquake of 6.6 magnitude strikes 39 km west-southwest of Ashkasham, shakes up India, Afghanistan, Tajikistan, Srinagar and Pakistan.
2019 – Scientists from the Event Horizon Telescope project announce the first ever image of a black hole, which was located in the centre of the M87 galaxy.

Births

Pre-1600
 401 – Theodosius II, Roman emperor (d. 450)
1018 – Nizam al-Mulk,  Persian scholar and vizier (d. 1092)
1472 – Margaret of York, English princess (d. 1472)
1480 – Philibert II, duke of Savoy (d. 1504)
1487 – William I, count of Nassau-Siegen (d. 1559)
1512 – James V, king of Scotland (d. 1542)
1579 – Augustus II, duke of Brunswick-Lüneburg (d. 1666)
1583 – Hugo Grotius, Dutch philosopher and jurist (d. 1645)

1601–1900
1603 – Christian, Prince-Elect of Denmark (d. 1647)
1651 – Ehrenfried Walther von Tschirnhaus, German mathematician, physicist, and physician (d. 1708)
1656 – René Lepage de Sainte-Claire, French-Canadian settler, founded Rimouski (d. 1718)
1704 – Benjamin Heath, English scholar and author (d. 1766)
1707 – Michel Corrette, French organist, composer, and author (d. 1795)
1713 – John Whitehurst, English geologist and clockmaker (d. 1788)
1755 – Samuel Hahnemann, German-French physician and academic (d. 1843)
1762 – Giovanni Aldini, Italian physicist and academic (d. 1834)
1769 – Jean Lannes, French marshal (d. 1809)
1778 – William Hazlitt, English essayist and critic (d. 1830)
1794 – Matthew C. Perry, English-Scottish American commander (d. 1858)
1806 – Juliette Drouet, French actress (d. 1883)
  1806   – Leonidas Polk, Scottish-American general and bishop (d. 1884)
1827 – Lew Wallace, American general, lawyer, and politician, 11th Governor of New Mexico Territory (d. 1905)
1829 – William Booth, English minister, founded The Salvation Army (d. 1912)
1847 – Joseph Pulitzer, Hungarian-American journalist, publisher, and politician, founded Pulitzer, Inc. (d. 1911)
1864 – Eugen d'Albert, Scottish-German pianist and composer (d. 1932)
1865 – Jack Miner, American-Canadian farmer, hunter, and environmentalist (d. 1944)
1867 – George William Russell, Irish author, poet, and painter (d. 1935)
1868 – George Arliss, English actor and playwright (d. 1946)
  1868   – Asriel Günzig, Moravian rabbi (d. 1931)
1873 – Kyösti Kallio, Finnish farmer, banker, and politician, 4th President of Finland (d. 1940)
1875 – George Clawley, English footballer (d. 1920)
1877 – Alfred Kubin, Austrian author and illustrator (d. 1959)
1879 – Bernhard Gregory, Estonian-German chess player (d. 1939)
  1879   – Coenraad Hiebendaal, Dutch rower and physician (d. 1921)
1880 – Frances Perkins, American sociologist, academic, and politician, United States Secretary of Labor (d. 1965)
  1880   – Montague Summers, English clergyman and author (d. 1948)
1886 – Johnny Hayes, American runner and trainer (d. 1965)
1887 – Bernardo Houssay, Argentinian physiologist and academic, Nobel Prize laureate (d. 1971)
1889 – Louis Rougier, French philosopher from the Vienna Circle (d. 1982)
1891 – Frank Barson, English footballer and coach (d. 1968)
1893 – Otto Steinböck, Austrian zoologist (d. 1969)
1894 – Ben Nicholson, British painter (d. 1982)
1897 – Prafulla Chandra Sen, Indian accountant and politician, 3rd Chief Minister of West Bengal (d. 1990)
1900 – Arnold Orville Beckman, American chemist, inventor, and philanthropist (d. 2004)

1901–present
1901 – Dhananjay Ramchandra Gadgil, Indian economist (d. 1971)
1903 – Patroklos Karantinos, Greek architect (d. 1976) 
  1903   – Clare Turlay Newberry, American author and illustrator (d. 1970)
1906 – Steve Anderson, American hurdler (d. 1988)
1910 – Margaret Clapp, American scholar and academic (d. 1974)
  1910   – Helenio Herrera, Argentinian footballer and manager (d. 1997)
  1910   – Paul Sweezy, American economist and publisher, founded the Monthly Review (d. 2004)
1911 – Martin Denny, American pianist and composer (d. 2005)
  1911   – Maurice Schumann, French journalist and politician, Minister of Foreign and European Affairs for France (d. 1998)
1912 – Boris Kidrič, Austrian-Slovenian politician, 1st Prime Minister of Slovenia (d. 1953)
1913 – Stefan Heym, German-American soldier and author (d. 2001)
1914 – Jack Badcock, Australian cricketer (d. 1982)
1915 – Harry Morgan, American actor and director (d. 2011)
  1915   – Leo Vroman, Dutch-American hematologist, poet, and illustrator (d. 2014)
1916 – Lee Jung-seob, Korean painter (d. 1956)
1917 – Jagjit Singh Lyallpuri, Indian politician (d. 2013)
  1917   – Robert Burns Woodward, American chemist and academic, Nobel Prize laureate (d. 1979)
1919 – John Houbolt, American engineer and academic (d. 2014)
1921 – Chuck Connors, American baseball player and actor (d. 1992)
  1921   – Jake Warren, Canadian soldier and diplomat, Canadian Ambassador to the United States (d. 2008)
  1921   – Sheb Wooley, American singer-songwriter and actor (d. 2003) 
1923 – Roger Gaillard, Haitian historian and author (d. 2000)
  1923   – Jane Kean, American actress and singer (d. 2013)
  1923   – Floyd Simmons, American decathlete and actor (d. 2008)
  1923   – Sid Tickridge, English footballer (d. 1997)
  1923   – John Watkins, South African cricketer (d. 2021)
1924 – Kenneth Noland, American soldier and painter (d. 2010)
1925 – Angelo Poffo, American wrestler and promoter (d. 2010)
1926 – Jacques Castérède, French pianist and composer (d. 2014)
  1926   – Junior Samples, American comedian (d. 1983)
1927 – Norma Candal, Puerto Rican actress (d. 2006)
  1927   – Marshall Warren Nirenberg, American biochemist and geneticist, Nobel Prize laureate (d. 2010)
1929 – Mike Hawthorn, English race car driver (d. 1959)
  1929   – Liz Sheridan, American actress (d. 2022) 
  1929   – Max von Sydow, Swedish-French actor (d. 2020)
1930 – Claude Bolling, French pianist, composer, and actor (d. 2020)
  1930   – Dolores Huerta, American activist, co-founded the United Farm Workers
  1930   – Spede Pasanen, Finnish film director and producer, comedian, and inventor (d. 2001)
1931 – Kishori Amonkar, Indian classical vocalist (d. 2017)
1932 – Delphine Seyrig, Swiss/Alsatian French actress (d. 1990)
  1932   – Omar Sharif, Egyptian actor and screenwriter (d. 2015)
1933 – Rokusuke Ei, Japanese composer and author (d. 2016)
  1933   – Helen McElhone, Scottish politician (d. 2013)
1934 – David Halberstam, American journalist and author (d. 2007)
1935 – Patrick Garland, English actor and director (d. 2013)
  1935   – Peter Hollingworth, Australian bishop, 23rd Governor General of Australia
  1935   – Christos Yannaras, Greek philosopher, theologian and author 
1936 – John A. Bennett, American soldier (d. 1961)
  1936   – John Howell, English long jumper
  1936   – John Madden, American football player, coach, and sportscaster (d. 2021)
  1936   – Bobby Smith, American singer (d. 2013)
1937 – Bella Akhmadulina, Soviet and Russian poet, short story writer, and translator (d. 2010)
1938 – Don Meredith, American football player and sportscaster (d. 2010)
1939 – Claudio Magris, Italian scholar, author, and translator
1940 – Gloria Hunniford, British radio and television host
1941 – Chrysostomos II of Cyprus, (d. 2022)
  1941   – Harold Long, Canadian politician (d. 2013)
  1941   – Paul Theroux, American novelist, short story writer, and travel writer
1942 – Nick Auf der Maur, Canadian journalist and politician (d. 1998)
  1942   – Ian Callaghan, English footballer
  1942   – Stuart Dybek,  American novelist, short story writer, and poet
1943 – Andrzej Badeński, Polish-German sprinter (d. 2008)
  1943   – Margaret Pemberton, English author
1945 – Kevin Berry, Australian swimmer (d. 2006)
1946 – David Angell, American screenwriter and producer (d. 2001)
  1946   – Bob Watson, American baseball player and manager (d. 2020)
  1946   – Adolf Winkelmann, German director, producer, and screenwriter
1947 – David A. Adler, American author and educator
  1947   – Bunny Wailer, Jamaican singer-songwriter and drummer (d. 2021) 
1948 – Mel Blount, American football player
1949 – Daniel Mangeas, French banker and sportscaster
  1949   – Eric Troyer, American singer-songwriter, keyboardist and guitarist
1950 – Ken Griffey, Sr., American baseball player and manager
  1950   – Eddie Hazel, American guitarist (d. 1992)
1951 – David Helvarg, American journalist and activist
1952 – Narayan Rane, Indian politician, 16th Chief Minister of Maharashtra
  1952   – Masashi Sada, Japanese singer, lyricist, composer, novelist, actor, and producer
  1952   – Steven Seagal, American actor, producer, and martial artist
1953 – David Moorcroft, English runner and businessman
  1953   – Pamela Wallin, Swedish-Canadian journalist, academic, and politician
1954 – Paul Bearer, American wrestler and manager (d. 2013)
  1954   – Anne Lamott, American author and educator
  1954   – Peter MacNicol, American actor
  1954   – Juan Williams, Panamanian-American journalist and author
1955 – Lesley Garrett, English soprano and actress
1956 – Carol V. Robinson, English chemist and academic
1957 – Aliko Dangote, Nigerian businessman, founded Dangote Group
  1957   – John M. Ford, American author and poet (d. 2006)
  1957   – Steve Gustafson, Spanish-American bass player 
  1957   – Rosemary Hill, English historian and author
1958 – Bob Bell, Northern Irish engineer
  1958   – Yefim Bronfman, Uzbek-American pianist
  1958   – Brigitte Holzapfel, German high jumper
1959 – Babyface, American singer-songwriter and producer 
  1959   – Yvan Loubier, Canadian economist and politician
  1959   – Brian Setzer, American singer-songwriter and guitarist
1960 – Steve Bisciotti, American businessman, co-founded Allegis Group
  1960   – Katrina Leskanich, American singer-songwriter and guitarist 
  1960   – Terry Teagle, American basketball player
1961 – Nicky Campbell, Scottish broadcaster and journalist
  1961   – Carole Goble, English computer scientist and academic
  1961   – Mark Jones, American basketball player
1962 – Steve Tasker, American football player and sportscaster
1963 – Warren DeMartini, American guitarist and songwriter 
  1963   – Jeff Gray, American baseball player and coach
  1963   – Doris Leuthard, Swiss lawyer and politician, 162nd President of the Swiss Confederation
1965 – Tim Alexander, American drummer and songwriter 
1966 – Steve Claridge, English footballer, manager, and sportscaster
1967 – Donald Dufresne, Canadian ice hockey player and coach
  1967   – David Rovics, American singer-songwriter
1968 – Metin Göktepe, Turkish photographer and journalist (d. 1996)
  1968   – Orlando Jones, American actor, producer, and screenwriter
1969 – Steve Glasson, Australian lawn bowler
  1969   – Ekaterini Koffa, Greek sprinter
1970 – Enrico Ciccone, Canadian ice hockey player
  1970   – Leonard Doroftei, Romanian-Canadian boxer
  1970   – Kenny Lattimore, American singer-songwriter
  1970   – Q-Tip, American rapper, producer, and actor 
1971 – Brad William Henke, American football player and actor
  1971   – Indro Olumets, Estonian footballer and coach
  1971   – Al Reyes, Dominican-American baseball player
1972 – Ian Harvey, Australian cricketer
  1972   – Priit Kasesalu, Estonian computer programmer, co-created Skype
  1972   – Gordon Buchanan, Scottish film maker
1973 – Guillaume Canet, French actor and director
  1973   – Roberto Carlos, Brazilian footballer and manager
  1973   – Aidan Moffat, Scottish singer-songwriter 
  1973   – Christopher Simmons, Canadian-American graphic designer, author, and academic
1974 – Eric Greitens, American soldier, author and politician
  1974   – Petros Passalis, Greek footballer
1975 – Chris Carrabba, American singer-songwriter and guitarist 
  1975   – Terrence Lewis, Indian dancer and choreographer
  1975   – David Harbour, American actor
1976 – Clare Buckfield, English actress
  1976   – Yoshino Kimura, Japanese actress and singer
  1976   – Sara Renner, Canadian skier
1977 – Stephanie Sheh, Taiwanese-American voice actress, director, and producer
1978 – Sir Christus, Finnish guitarist (d. 2017)
1979 – Iván Alonso, Uruguayan footballer
  1979   – Kenyon Coleman, American football player
  1979   – Rachel Corrie, American author and activist (d. 2003)
  1979   – Tsuyoshi Domoto, Japanese singer-songwriter and actor
  1979   – Sophie Ellis-Bextor, English singer-songwriter 
  1979   – Pavlos Fyssas, Greek rapper (d. 2013) 
  1979   – Peter Kopteff, Finnish footballer
1980 – Sean Avery, Canadian ice hockey player and model
  1980   – Charlie Hunnam, English actor 
  1980   – Shao Jiayi, Chinese footballer
  1980   – Kasey Kahne, American race car driver
  1980   – Andy Ram, Israeli tennis player
  1980   – Bryce Soderberg, American singer-songwriter and bass player 
1981 – Laura Bell Bundy, American actress and singer
  1981   – Liz McClarnon, English singer and dancer 
  1981   – Michael Pitt, American actor, model and musician
  1981   – Alexei Semenov, Russian ice hockey player
1982 – Andre Ethier, American baseball player
  1982   – Chyler Leigh, American actress and singer
1983 – Jamie Chung, American actress
  1983   – Andrew Dost, American guitarist and songwriter 
  1983   – Ryan Merriman, American actor
  1983   – Hannes Sigurðsson, Icelandic footballer
1984 – Faustina Agolley, Australian television host
  1984   – Jeremy Barrett, American figure skater
  1984   – Mandy Moore, American singer-songwriter and actress
  1984   – David Obua, Ugandan footballer
  1984   – Damien Perquis, French-Polish footballer
  1984   – Gonzalo Javier Rodríguez, Argentinian footballer
1985 – Barkhad Abdi, Somali-American actor and director
  1985   – Willo Flood, Irish footballer
  1985   – Jesús Gámez, Spanish footballer
  1985   – Dion Phaneuf, Canadian ice hockey player
1986 – Olivia Borlée, Belgian sprinter
  1986   – Fernando Gago, Argentine footballer
  1986   – Corey Kluber, American baseball pitcher
  1986   – Vincent Kompany, Belgian footballer
  1986   – Tore Reginiussen, Norwegian footballer
1987 – Shay Mitchell, Canadian actress and model
  1987   – Hayley Westenra, New Zealand soprano
1988 – Chris Heston, American baseball pitcher
  1988   – Kareem Jackson, American football player
  1988   – Haley Joel Osment, American actor
1990 – Ben Amos, English footballer
  1990   – Andile Jali, South African footballer
  1990   – Ricky Leutele, Australian-Samoan rugby league player
  1990   – Maren Morris, American singer
  1990   – Alex Pettyfer, English actor
1991 – AJ Michalka, American actress and singer
1992 – Jack Buchanan, Australian rugby league player
  1992   – Sadio Mané, Senegalese footballer 
  1992 – Chaz Mostert - Australian Supercars driver 
  1992   – Daisy Ridley, English actress
1993 – Sofia Carson, American singer and actress
1994 – Siobhan Hunter, Scottish footballer
1995 – Ian Nelson, American actor
1996 – Thanasi Kokkinakis, Australian tennis player
  1996   – Audrey Whitby, American actress
1997 – Claire Wineland, American activist and author (d. 2018)
1998 – Anna Pogorilaya, Russian figure skater
2001 – Ky Baldwin, Australian singer and actor
  2001   – Noa Kirel, Israeli singer

Deaths

Pre-1600
 879 – Louis the Stammerer, king of West Francia (b. 846)
 943 – Landulf I, prince of Benevento and Capua
 948 – Hugh of Arles, king of Italy
1008 – Notker of Liège, French bishop (b. 940)
1216 – Eric X, king of Sweden (b. 1180)
1282 – Ahmad Fanakati, chief minister under Kublai Khan
1309 – Elisabeth von Rapperswil, Swiss countess (b. 1261)
1362 – Maud, English noblewoman (b. 1339)
1500 – Michael Tarchaniota Marullus, Greek scholar and poet
1533 – Frederick I, king of Denmark and Norway (b. 1471)
1545 – Costanzo Festa, Italian composer
1585 – Gregory XIII, pope of the Catholic Church (b. 1502)
1598 – Jacopo Mazzoni, Italian philosopher (b. 1548)
1599 – Gabrielle d'Estrées, French mistress of Henry IV of France (b. 1571)

1601–1900
1601 – Mark Alexander Boyd, Scottish soldier and poet (b. 1562)
1619 – Thomas Jones, English-Irish archbishop and politician, Lord Chancellor of Ireland (b. 1550)
1640 – Agostino Agazzari, Italian composer and theorist (b. 1578)
1644 – William Brewster, English official and pilgrim leader (b. 1566)
1646 – Santino Solari, Swiss architect and sculptor (b. 1576)
1667 – Jan Marek Marci, Czech physician and author (b. 1595)
1704 – Wilhelm Egon von Fürstenberg, German cardinal (b. 1629)
1756 – Giacomo Antonio Perti, Italian composer (b. 1661)
1760 – Jean Lebeuf, French historian and author (b. 1687)
1786 – John Byron, English admiral and politician, 24th Commodore Governor of Newfoundland (b. 1723)
1806 – Horatio Gates, English-American general (b. 1727)
1813 – Joseph-Louis Lagrange, Italian mathematician and astronomer (b. 1736)
1821 – Gregory V of Constantinople, Ecumenical Patriarch of Constantinople (b. 1746) 
1823 – Karl Leonhard Reinhold, Austrian philosopher and academic (b. 1757)
1871 – Lucio Norberto Mansilla, Argentinian general and politician (b. 1789)
1889 – William Crichton, Scottish engineer and shipbuilder (b. 1827)

1901–present
1909 – Algernon Charles Swinburne, English poet, playwright, novelist, and critic (b. 1837)
1919 – Emiliano Zapata, Mexican general (b. 1879)
1920 – Moritz Cantor, German mathematician and historian (b. 1829)
1931 – Kahlil Gibran, Lebanese-American poet, painter, and philosopher (b. 1883)
1935 – Rosa Campbell Praed, Australian novelist (b. 1851)
1938 – King Oliver, American cornet player and bandleader (b. 1885)
1942 – Carl Schenstrøm, Danish actor and director (b. 1881)
1943 – Andreas Faehlmann, Estonian-German sailor and engineer (b. 1898)
1945 – Hendrik Nicolaas Werkman, Dutch printer and typographer (b. 1882)
1947 – Charles Nordhoff, English-American lieutenant and author (b. 1887)
1950 – Fevzi Çakmak, Turkish field marshal and politician, 2nd Prime Minister of Turkey (b. 1876)
1954 – Auguste Lumière, French director and producer (b. 1862)
  1954   – Oscar Mathisen, Norwegian speed skater (b. 1888)
1955 – Pierre Teilhard de Chardin, French priest, theologian, and philosopher (b. 1881)
1958 – Chuck Willis, American singer-songwriter (b. 1928)
1960 – André Berthomieu, French director and screenwriter (b. 1903)
1962 – Michael Curtiz, Hungarian-American director, producer, and screenwriter (b. 1886)
  1962   – Stuart Sutcliffe, Scottish artist and musician (b. 1940)
1965 – Lloyd Casner, American race car driver, founded Casner Motor Racing Division (b. 1928)
  1965   – Linda Darnell, American actress (b. 1923)
1966 – Evelyn Waugh, English soldier, novelist, journalist and critic (b. 1903)
1968 – Gustavs Celmiņš, Latvian lieutenant and politician (b. 1899)
1969 – Harley Earl, American businessman (b. 1893)
1975 – Walker Evans, American photographer (b. 1903)
  1975   – Marjorie Main, American actress (b. 1890)
1978 – Hjalmar Mäe, Estonian politician (b. 1901)
1979 – Nino Rota, Italian pianist, composer, and conductor (b. 1911)
1980 – Kay Medford, American actress and singer (b. 1919)
1981 – Howard Thurman, American author, philosopher and civil rights activist (b. 1899)
1983 – Issam Sartawi, Palestinian activist (b. 1935)
1985 – Zisis Verros, Greek chieftain of the Macedonian Struggle (b. 1880)
1986 – Linda Creed, American singer-songwriter (b. 1948)
1988 – Ezekias Papaioannou, Greek Cypriot politician (b. 1908) 
1991 – Kevin Peter Hall, American actor (b. 1955)
  1991   – Martin Hannett, English guitarist and producer (b. 1948)
  1991   – Natalie Schafer, American actress (b. 1900)
1992 – Sam Kinison, American comedian and actor (b. 1953)
1993 – Chris Hani, South African activist and politician (b. 1942)
1994 – Sam B. Hall, Jr., American lawyer, judge, and politician (b. 1924)
1995 – Morarji Desai, Indian politician, 4th Prime Minister of India (b. 1896)
1997 – Michael Dorris, American author and academic (b. 1945)
  1998   – Seraphim of Athens, Greek archbishop (b. 1913)
1999 – Heinz Fraenkel-Conrat, German-American biochemist and physician (b. 1910)
  1999   – Jean Vander Pyl, American actress and voice artist (b. 1919)
2000 – Peter Jones, English actor and screenwriter (b. 1920)
  2000   – Larry Linville, American actor (b. 1939)
2003 – Little Eva, American singer (b. 1943)
2004 – Jacek Kaczmarski, Polish singer-songwriter, guitarist, and poet (b. 1957)
  2004   – Sakıp Sabancı, Turkish businessman and philanthropist, founded Sabancı Holding (b. 1933)
2005 – Norbert Brainin, Austrian violinist (b. 1923)
  2005   – Scott Gottlieb, American drummer (b. 1970)
  2005   – Archbishop Iakovos of America (b. 1911)
  2005   – Al Lucas, American football player (b. 1978)
  2005   – Wally Tax, Dutch singer-songwriter (b. 1948)
2006 – Kleitos Kyrou, Greek poet and translator (b. 1921) 
2007 – Charles Philippe Leblond, French-Canadian biologist and academic (b. 1910)
  2007   – Dakota Staton, American singer (b. 1930)
2009 – Deborah Digges, American poet and educator (b. 1950)
  2009   – Ioannis Patakis, Greek politician (b. 1940) 
2010 – Casualties in the 2010 Polish Air Force Tu-154 crash included:
Ryszard Kaczorowski, Polish soldier and politician, 6th President of the Republic of Poland (b. 1919)
Maria Kaczyńska, Polish economist, First Lady of Poland (b. 1942)
Lech Kaczyński, Polish lawyer and politician, 4th President of Poland (b. 1949)
Anna Walentynowicz, Ukrainian-Polish journalist and activist (b. 1929)
  2010   – Dixie Carter, American actress and singer (b. 1939)
2012 – Raymond Aubrac, French engineer and activist (b. 1914)
  2012   – Barbara Buchholz, German theremin player and composer (b. 1959)
  2012   – Lili Chookasian, Armenian-American operatic singer (b. 1921)
  2012   – Luis Aponte Martínez, Puerto Rican cardinal (b. 1922)
  2012   – Akin Omoboriowo, Nigerian lawyer and politician (b. 1932)
2013 – Lorenzo Antonetti, Italian cardinal (b. 1922)
  2013   – Raymond Boudon, French sociologist and academic (b. 1934)
  2013   – Binod Bihari Chowdhury, Bangladeshi activist (b. 1911)
  2013   – Robert Edwards, English physiologist and academic, Nobel Prize laureate (b. 1925)
  2013   – Olive Lewin, Jamaican anthropologist, musicologist, and author (b. 1927)
  2013   – Gordon Thomas, English cyclist (b. 1921)
  2013   – Angela Voigt, German long jumper (b. 1951)
2014 – Dominique Baudis, French journalist and politician (b. 1947)
  2014   – Jim Flaherty, Canadian lawyer and politician, 37th Canadian Minister of Finance (b. 1949)
  2014   – Richard Hoggart, English author and academic (b. 1918)
  2014   – Sue Townsend, English author and playwright (b. 1946)
2015 – Richie Benaud, Australian cricketer and sportscaster (b. 1930)
  2015   – Raúl Héctor Castro, Mexican-American politician and diplomat, 14th Governor of Arizona (b. 1916)
  2015   – Judith Malina, German-American actress and director, co-founded The Living Theatre (b. 1926)
  2015   – Rose Francine Rogombé, Gabonese lawyer and politician, President of Gabon (b. 1942)
  2015   – Peter Walsh, Australian farmer and politician, 6th Australian Minister for Finance (b. 1935)
2016 – Howard Marks, Welsh cannabis smuggler, writer, and legalisation campaigner (b. 1945)

Holidays and observances
Christian feast day:
Fulbert of Chartres
James, Azadanus and Abdicius
Mikael Agricola (Lutheran)
Pierre Teilhard de Chardin (Episcopal Church)
William of Ockham (Anglicanism)
William Law (Anglicanism)
April 10 (Eastern Orthodox liturgics)
Day of the Builder (Azerbaijan)
Feast of the Third Day of the Writing of the Book of the Law (Thelema)
Siblings Day (International observance)

References

External links

 BBC: On This Day
 
 Historical Events on April 10

Days of the year
April